Mezőkövesd  is a town in Borsod-Abaúj-Zemplén county, Northern Hungary.

History

The area has been inhabited since the Great Migration. It is likely that the first Hungarian settlement was formed here shortly after the conquest of Hungary, but in 1275 in a church document it was mentioned as a deserted place. It is likely that the village was destroyed during the Mongol invasion of Hungary.

In the 13th century, Mezőkövesd was the southernmost town belonging to the Diósgyőr estate. In 1464 the town got a seal and privileges from King Matthias. The name of the Matyó people, who inhabited the town and the area, is likely to have come from his name.

In 1544 the town was occupied by the Turks. In 1552 – in the year when the Castle of Eger was under siege by the Turks – Mezőkövesd was completely destroyed. Though it was rebuilt, after the battle in the nearby village of Mezőkeresztes, it was destroyed again in 1596 and wasn't rebuilt for almost 100 years.

Until 1784 Mezőkövesd was royal estate. In that year the town freed itself from its feudal obligations. The following years brought prosperity. In 1860 the railway line reached the town.

In 1938 a thermal spring was found in the estate of Lajos Zsóry. A thermal bath was built and now it is one of the main tourist attractions of the town. In 1941 the town had 21,000 residents, the highest population ever recorded.

Before World War II, there was a Jewish community in Mezőkövesd. At its height, there were 862 Jews in the community most of them were murdered by the Nazis in the Holocaust.

Tourist sights
 Matyó Museum
 Museum of Agriculture
 Zsóry Thermal Baths, with indoor and outdoor swimming and medicinal pools. The sulphur-rich waters of the medicinal pools have curative properties.
 Matyó homes, streets with the atmosphere of 19th-century country towns - also called "Hadas" district, meaning that people who used to live here inhabited the area in big family groups. In the ancient cottages local folk artists offer a view of what it is like to be "Matyó". The houses give home to embroiderers, a furniture painter, a glass cutter, a potter and for the children: a gingerbread maker, among other craftsmen.

Twin towns – sister cities

Mezőkövesd is twinned with:
 Bad Salzungen, Germany
 Petriolo, Italy
 Rüdesheim am Rhein, Germany
 Târgu Secuiesc, Romania
 Żory, Poland

Gallery

Notable people
Csézy (born 1979), singer
Funktasztikus, rapper
József Jacsó (born 1962), weightlifter
Szabolcs Zubai (born 1984), handballer

References

External links

  in Hungarian, English, German and Polish
 Informational web site
 The famous Matyó embroidery—traditionally made only in Mezőkövesd and two neighbouring villages, it is one of the finest examples of Hungarian folk art
 Zsóry Spa webpage - Mezőkövesd thermal bath site
 A rose by any other name – article from the Budapest Sun
Mezőkövesd on SeeUinHungary.com

Populated places in Borsod-Abaúj-Zemplén County